Banjar Regency is one of the eleven regencies in the Indonesian province of South Kalimantan; the capital is Martapura. It covers an area of 4,668.5 km2, and had a population of 506,839 at the 2010 Census, 553,721 at the 2015 Census and  	565,635 at the 2020 Census. The official estimate as at mid 2021 was 572,109. It lies immediately to the east of the city of Banjarmasin and north of the city of Banjarbaru, which it surrounds on the latter's west, north and east sides; the regency capital of Martapura is immediately north of Banjarbaru, of which it is effectively an extension. This regency is noted for its diamond mines and its people's religiosity (of Islam). Motto: "Barakat" (Banjarese:"Blessing").

Administration
At the time of the 2010 Census, Banjar Regency was divided into nineteen districts (kecamatan). Subsequently a twentieth district (Cintapuri Darussalam) was created by division from Simpang Empat District. The districts are listed below with their areas and their populations at the 2010 Census and the 2020 Census, together with the official estimates as of mid 2021. The table includes the number of administrative villages (desa) in each district, and its post code.

Note: (a) the 2010 population figure for Cintapuri Darussalam District is included in that for Simpang Empat District, from which it was divided.

Tourist attractions
 Al-Karomah Great Mosque
 Bincau Fish Pond
 Cahaya Bumi Selamat Park
 Lok Baintan Floating Market
 Sultan Adam Cemetery

See also 
 Banjar people

References

External links 

 

Regencies of South Kalimantan